Zahra Ghanbari (born 4 March 1992) is an Iranian footballer who plays as a forward for Kowsar Women Football League club Bam Khatoon FC and the Iran national team.

Club career
Ghanbari has played in Iraq for the Northern Gas Team in Kirkuk.

International career 
With 13 international goals for Iran, Ghanbari is her national team's all-time top goalscorer.

International goals

References

External links
 

1992 births
Living people
Iranian women's footballers
Iran women's international footballers
Women's association football forwards
People from Kermanshah Province
Iranian expatriate  footballers
Iranian expatriate sportspeople in Iraq
Expatriate  footballers in Iraq
21st-century Iranian women